"Freedom" is a 1970 R&B / funk song released by the Isley Brothers on their T-Neck imprint. The song was written and produced by O'Kelly Isley, Ronald Isley, and Rudolph Isley.

Chart performance
The song was issued on their 1970 album, Get into Something, and was one of six R&B charting hits the group scored from the album, peaking at number 11. On the pop chart, it reached number 72.

References

1970 singles
1970 songs
The Isley Brothers songs
T-Neck Records singles
Songs written by O'Kelly Isley Jr.
Songs written by Rudolph Isley
Songs written by Ronald Isley
American rhythm and blues songs